Joseph William Burton (October 12, 1892 – August 1, 1960) was a Canadian politician and farmer.

Burton was a grand knight of the Knights of Columbus and a staunch Roman Catholic and socialist who argued during political meetings in Humboldt, Saskatchewan that the Co-operative Commonwealth Federation was more in line with the demands for social justice made in papal encyclicals than other parties.

He was elected to the Saskatchewan Legislative Assembly in a 1938 provincial by-election becoming the only Catholic MLA in the province. In an August 9, 1943 federal by-election, he was elected to the House of Commons of Canada representing Humboldt for the CCF. He was re-elected in the 1945 general election but defeated in 1949.

During a 1947 debate in the House, Burton explained the compatibility of his religious and political views: 

After losing his federal seat, Burton returned to provincial politics as a Saskatchewan CCF MLA in the 1952 provincial election and served as Provincial Secretary in Tommy Douglas' cabinet from 1952 until the 1956 provincial election when he was defeated by Mary Batten of the Saskatchewan Liberal Party.

References

External links

 

1892 births
1960 deaths
20th-century Canadian legislators
Canadian anti-capitalists
Canadian Christian socialists
Canadian Roman Catholics
Catholic socialists
Co-operative Commonwealth Federation MPs
Farmers from Saskatchewan
People from Humboldt, Saskatchewan
Saskatchewan Co-operative Commonwealth Federation MLAs